Ferran Corominas Telechea (born 5 January 1983), known as Coro, is a Spanish former footballer who played as a forward.

He spent the majority of his professional career with Espanyol, appearing in 200 competitive games while scoring 24 goals and winning the 2006 Copa del Rey with the club. In 2017 he signed with Goa in the Indian Super League, winning several team and individual accolades and also being at one point the competition's all-time top-scorer.

Coro won the 2002 European Under-19 Championship with Spain.

Club career

Espanyol
Born in Vilobí d'Onyar, Girona, Catalonia, Coro was a product of RCD Espanyol's youth system. He made his first-team debut on 2 November 2003 in a 2–0 home loss to Real Zaragoza, but spent his first professional seasons with the reserve side in the Segunda División B.

In the last matchday of 2005–06, on 13 May 2006, Coro scored a last-minute goal against Real Sociedad, with that 1–0 win saving Espanyol's La Liga status and Deportivo Alavés being relegated instead. He added another in the final of the Copa del Rey, in a 4–1 defeat of Zaragoza.

Coro finished 2006–07 with four league goals in 30 games, adding five in 11 matches in the team's runner-up run in the UEFA Cup, including one apiece in both legs of the semi-final clash against SV Werder Bremen. In the following three years he totalled 75 league appearances with six goals, alternating the substitutes bench with the starting XI.

Girona and Elche
In mid-January 2011, completely ostracised by manager – and former teammate at Espanyol – Mauricio Pochettino, Coro signed with fellow league club CA Osasuna on loan until the end of the campaign. He spent the following seasons competing in Segunda División, appearing and scoring regularly for Girona FC and Elche CF; he helped the latter return to the top flight in his first year, after an absence of 24 years.

Goa
On 18 July 2017, 34-year-old Coro signed for Indian Super League franchise FC Goa after a brief stint in the Cypriot First Division with Doxa Katokopias FC. He scored his first goal for the club on 19 November, finding the net in the 25th minute of a 3–2 away victory over Chennaiyin FC. Two hat-tricks followed on 30 November and 9 December, helping the hosts defeat Bengaluru FC (4–3) and Kerala Blasters FC (5–2), and he eventually won the Golden Boot with 18 goals.

On 30 April 2018, Coro renewed his contract by one year. He continued his good form the following season by scoring a league-best 16 goals, also being awarded the Golden Ball and helping his team reach the finals.

On 25 May 2019, Coro agreed to another extension at the Fatorda Stadium.

Later career
Coro joined CD Atlético Baleares on 29 September 2020. The following June, he left.

Career statistics

Club

Honours
Espanyol
Copa del Rey: 2005–06
UEFA Cup runner-up: 2006–07

Elche
Segunda División: 2012–13

Goa
ISL League Winners Shield: 2019–20
Super Cup: 2019

Spain U19
UEFA European Under-19 Championship: 2002

Spain U20
FIFA U-20 World Cup runner-up: 2003

Individual
Indian Super League Golden Boot: 2017–18, 2018–19
Super Cup Golden Boot: 2019
Football Players' Association of India Foreign Player of the Year: 2019

References

External links

1983 births
Living people
People from Selva
Sportspeople from the Province of Girona
Spanish footballers
Footballers from Catalonia
Association football forwards
La Liga players
Segunda División players
Segunda División B players
RCD Espanyol B footballers
RCD Espanyol footballers
CA Osasuna players
Girona FC players
Elche CF players
RCD Mallorca players
CD Atlético Baleares footballers
Cypriot First Division players
Doxa Katokopias FC players
Indian Super League players
FC Goa players
Spain youth international footballers
Catalonia international footballers
Spanish expatriate footballers
Expatriate footballers in Cyprus
Expatriate footballers in India
Spanish expatriate sportspeople in Cyprus
Spanish expatriate sportspeople in India